Mannarpuram is a part of the city of Tiruchirappalli in Tamil Nadu, India. The headquarters of the Trichy division of the Tamil Nadu Electricity Board (TNEB) are located here. The Trichy Cricket Association's Mannarpuram Coaching Academy, one of the city's important coaching academies is also located here.

References 

Neighbourhoods and suburbs of Tiruchirappalli